Bagnold may refer to:

 Enid Bagnold (1889–1981), author and playwright
 Millicent Bagnold, a character in the Harry Potter books
 Ralph Bagnold (1896–1990), British Army Officer
 Bagnold number, a representation of the ratio of stresses within granular flows
 Bagnold formula, a calculation relating the amount of a wind-blown fluid to wind speed 
 Bagnold Dunes, an extraterrestrial dune field